This article lists important figures and events in Malayan public affairs during the year 1956, together with births and deaths of significant Malayans.

Incumbent political figures

Central level
 Governor of Malaya :
 Donald Charles MacGillivray
 Chief Minister Federation of Malaya :
 Tunku Abdul Rahman Putra Al-Haj

State level
  Perlis :
 Raja of Perlis : Syed Harun Putra Jamalullail 
 Menteri Besar of Perlis : Raja Ahmad Raja Endut
  Johore :
 Sultan of Johor : Sultan Ibrahim Al-Masyhur
 Menteri Besar of Johor : Wan Idris Ibrahim
  Kedah :
 Sultan of Kedah : Sultan Badlishah
 Menteri Besar of Kedah : Tunku Ismail Tunku Yahya
  Kelantan :
 Sultan of Kelantan : Sultan Ibrahim
 Menteri Besar of Kelantan : Tengku Muhammad Hamzah Raja Muda Long Zainal Abidin
  Terengganu :
 Sultan of Terengganu : Sultan Ismail Nasiruddin Shah
 Menteri Besar of Terengganu : Raja Kamaruddin Idris
  Selangor :
 Sultan of Selangor : Sultan Sir Hishamuddin Alam Shah Al-Haj 
 Menteri Besar of Selangor : Raja Uda Raja Muhammad
  Penang :
 Monarchs : Queen Elizabeth II
 Residents-Commissioner : Robert Porter Bingham
  Malacca :
 Monarchs : Queen Elizabeth II
 Residents-Commissioner : Maurice John Hawyard (Acting)
  Negri Sembilan :
 Yang di-Pertuan Besar of Negeri Sembilan : Tuanku Abdul Rahman ibni Almarhum Tuanku Muhammad
 Menteri Besar Negeri Sembilan : Shamsuddin Naim
   Pahang :
 Sultan of Pahang : Sultan Abu Bakar
 Menteri Besar of Pahang : Tengku Mohamad Sultan Ahmad 
  Perak :
 British Adviser of Perak : Ian Blelloch (until unknown date, position abolished)
 Sultan of Perak : Sultan Yusuf Izzuddin Shah 
 Menteri Besar of Perak : Abdul Wahab Toh Muda Abdul Aziz

Events
8 February – The Treaty of London 1956 was signed to set up the independent Federation of Malaya
20 February – Tunku Abdul Rahman announced in Malacca Town after he returned from London that Malaya would become independent on 31 August 1957.
March – The Rural and Industrial Development Authority (RIDA) Training Centre (Dewan Latehan RIDA) was established.
March – Reid Commission is established for drafting the Constitution of the Federation of Malaya .
22 June – Dewan Bahasa dan Pustaka was established as Balai Pustaka in Johor Bahru.
22 June – Pipeline ambush.
1 July – The Federal Land Development Authority (FELDA) was established.
24 October – Malayan Party was established by Tan Gee Gak.
22 November-8 December – Malaya competed for the first time in 1956 Olympic Games at Melbourne, Australia. 32 competitors, 31 men and 1 woman, took part in 13 events in 5 sports.
28 December – Baling Talks is held to attempt resolve Malayan Emergency.
 Unknown date – Catholic High School, Malaysia in Petaling Jaya is founded by Rev. Bro. Philippe Wu of the Marist Brothers.

Births 
 1 January – Mona Fandey – Singer and witchcraft involved in murdering Mazlan Idris in 1993 (died by hanging 2001)
 8 February – Raja Iskandar Dzulkarnain – Raja Di-Hilir Perak
 2 May – Mohamad bin Hasan – Politician 
 10 July – K. Rajagopal – Coach and footballer
 11 September – Mohd Hatta Ramli – Politician
 2 November – Arif Shah Omar Shah – Politician
 15 November – Ong Ka Ting – Politician
 27 November – Sultan Nazrin Muizuddin Shah – 35th Sultan of Perak
 Unknown date – Louisa Chong – Actor

Deaths
January 22 - Tun Yusuf

See also
 1956 
 1955 in Malaya | 1957 in Malaya
 History of Malaysia

References

 
Years of the 20th century in Malaysia
Malaya
Malaya
Malaya